Nicholas Carent was the Dean of Wells from 1446 to 1467.

References

Deans of Wells